Harry Clifford Taylor (12 March 1924 – 27 November 1995) was a British alpine skier. He competed in three events at the 1948 Winter Olympics.

References

1924 births
1995 deaths
British male alpine skiers
Olympic alpine skiers of Great Britain
Alpine skiers at the 1948 Winter Olympics
Place of birth missing
Royal Artillery soldiers